Kletsk District is a district of Minsk Region, Belarus. Its capital is the town of Kletsk.

References

 
Districts of Minsk Region